Vernicia is a genus in the spurge family Euphorbiaceae, first described as a genus in 1790. It is native to China, Japan, India, and Indochina. The species have often been included within the related genus Aleurites.

They are shrubs or trees growing to 20 m tall. The leaves are alternate, broad, and entire to palmately lobed; they may be either deciduous or evergreen. The flowers may be either monoecious or dioecious.

Species

References

Aleuritideae
Euphorbiaceae genera